Yaser Shigan (born August 17, 1976) is a Syrian boxer, who won the only gold medal for Syria at the 2005 Mediterranean Games in Almería, Spain. In the final of the men's featherweight division (– 57 kg) he defeated former Romanian Ovidiu Bobîrnat, who now competes for Cyprus.

References
 juegosmediterraneos

1976 births
Living people
Featherweight boxers
Syrian male boxers

Mediterranean Games gold medalists for Syria
Competitors at the 2005 Mediterranean Games
Mediterranean Games medalists in boxing